San Antonio, officially the Municipality of San Antonio, is a 1st class municipality in the province of Nueva Ecija, Philippines. According to the 2020 census, it has a population of 83,060 people.

Etymology
The present name of the town was given in 1843 in honor of the patron saint, San Antonio Abad, by Father Leocadio Luis, the first priest of the town. Before its organization and recognition as a town by means of a decree promulgated during the Spanish regime, this was a barangay of Gapan and was known as Barrio Delinquente.

History
San Antonio was previously called as the barrio of Delinquente as old residents claimed that the name Delinquente originated by the sinking of a Casco (big boat or banca) fully loaded with palay in Pampanga River.

It was partitioned from the town of Gapan in 1843 by the order of Governor-General Marcelino Oraa, along with the town of San Isidro. The movement of the separation of Barrio Delinquente from the town of Gapan, and its organization as an independent municipality was ignited in 1839. The petition of the residents of Barrio Delinquente was finally approved in November 1842 but the definite separation from the town of Gapan took place in 1843.

It is bounded by the towns of Jaen to its eastern side, Zaragosa is to the north, Cabiao and San Isidro, and Concepcion in the Province of Tarlac is at its western border.

Travelling from the Philippine capital city of Manila, a popular route going to San Antonio is via the North Luzon Expressway (NLEX). Turning north-east and exiting the NLEX at the San Simon junction, the journey continues to Arayat, the last town of Pampanga before reaching Cabiao. From Cabiao, one can opt to continue towards the town of San Isidro and then take a left turn towards Jaen and then before Jaen town proper take another turn towards San Antonio. There is an alternative backroad route leading to the southern part of San Antonio and this can be taken immediately after entering Brgy. Concepcion, turning left towards the Santa Isabel Bridge which crosses the Pampanga river.

The older and now slower route is the bus transport route which leaves the NLEX at Santa Rita and traverses the Pan-Philippine Highway across the length of the Province of Bulacan up to Gapan in Nueva Ecija and turning left on the Gapan-Olongapo Road.

Geography

Barangays
San Antonio is politically divided into 16 barangays.

 Buliran
 Cama Juan
 Julo
 Lawang Kupang	
 Luyos	
 Maugat	
 Panabingan	
 Papaya	
 Poblacion	
 San Francisco	(KC-1) Kaisiwan
 San Jose (Cabungan)
 San Mariano
 Santa Barbara
 Santa Cruz (Parang)
 Santo Cristo
 Tikiw

Climate

Demographics

Economy

Government

Municipal elected official (2022–present):
Mayor
Arvin Salonga
Vice Mayor
Julie Maxwell
Councilors:
Roberto Carpio
Manolito Balcos
Daniel Pamintuan
Christopher Cunanan
Renier Umali
Eduardo Ostares
RC Cruz
Roy Juliano

Gallery

References

External links

 [ Philippine Standard Geographic Code]
Philippine Census Information
Local Governance Performance Management System
Municipality of San Antonio, Nueva Ecija

Municipalities of Nueva Ecija
Populated places on the Pampanga River